"Estamos Bien" (English: "We're Good") is a song by the Puerto Rican Latin trap artist Bad Bunny. The song was released by Rimas Entertainment on June 28, 2018, as the first single from his first studio album, X 100pre (2018). It was written by Benito Martínez and Ismael Flores and produced by Tainy and La Paciencia.

Background 
Bad Bunny had disappeared from social media for a time when he was overwhelmed with his sudden rise to fame. Views of his videos on YouTube were seven billion in 2018.

Rolling Stone magazine called it "electro-psych bliss". In the song, Bad Bunny describes being okay, and that we are all okay and all of mine are okay. The lyrics mention a huge rainstorm, starting from nothing, and that power has not been restored to his home. He dedicated the song to victims of Hurricane Maria when he made his first appearance on American TV on The Tonight Show Starring Jimmy Fallon saying, "3,000 people died in Hurricane Maria and Donald Trump is in denial." Then, as a clip of Hurricane Maria striking the island played on a screen behind him, he began to sing  (in English "we're good, everything is good, there's nothing wrong here, with or without hundred dollar bills, we're good.")

Composition 
The song "Estamos Bien" is an upbeat and melodic Latin trap song with a reggaeton rhythm at the end of the song that goes 120 BPM.

Music video 
By April 2019, the music video for the song had received over 300 million views. In the video, Bad Bunny is seen enjoying his time with friends and paints his fingernails purple and blows them dry, questioning traditional male expectations.

Charts

Weekly charts

Year-end charts

Certifications

Credits and personnel 
 Bad Bunny – songwriting, lead vocals
 Ismael Flores – songwriting
 Tainy – producer
 La Paciencia – producer

References 

2018 singles
2018 songs
Bad Bunny songs
Spanish-language songs
Songs written by Bad Bunny